Acrimony is a 2018 American  psychological thriller film written, produced and directed by Tyler Perry. The film stars Taraji P. Henson, Lyriq Bent and Crystle Stewart. It follows a loyal wife who decides to take revenge on her ex-husband who has wronged her in life. Principal photography began in October 2016 in Pittsburgh. Acrimony was released in the United States by Lionsgate on March 30, 2018. It received generally negative reviews and grossed $46 million worldwide.

Plot

Melinda Moore is a steadfast, hardworking wife who supports her husband, Robert Gayle, an engineer trying to sell an innovative battery design. A running total/dwindling balance of the proceeds Melinda receives after her mother's death is portrayed as the couple gets in over their heads in debt, which fractures their marriage over time. The film is divided into categories based in the emotional spectrum that Melinda experiences, as follows:

Acrimony
Melinda  bumps into engineering student Robert during college, goes into a rage and assaults him physically and verbally, revealing her normal tendencies. Later that day he appears at her dorm room to return some papers that got mixed up when they bumped into each other, and they gradually become close. On the day of her mother's funeral, Robert comforts Melinda, leading to them having sex, and the pair start dating. Melinda frequently listens to Robert speak about his life and she decides to buy him a new car. Although he did not ask her to buy the car, he accepts it. Melinda believes he is aware of his own influence on her but she strives to please him anyway. Melinda later visits Robert at his RV and discovers him cheating on her with a woman named Diana Wells. She goes into another rage and rams the RV with her car with both the two lovers inside, seriously injuring herself in the process. Melinda destroys Robert's car before passing out from injury and is rushed to the hospital for an emergency full hysterectomy, rendering her unable to bear children. Melinda and Robert reconcile and marry, despite the objections of her sisters, June and Brenda. Brenda warns Melinda not to tell Robert about the amount of money their mother left her.

Years later, Melinda supports them both, as Robert is unable to find work because he was a felon and spent two years in prison for robbing a grocery store. June and Brenda are leery of Robert's intentions with Melinda's inheritance. Robert talks Melinda into mortgaging their house so he can build a prototype of a revolutionary battery he has been designing since prison, which he hopes to sell to Prescott, a venture capitalist.  Diana, now working as an assistant to Prescott, arranges for Robert to have a meeting with him. After finding Diana's wallet in Robert's truck, June and Brenda tell Melinda that Robert is cheating on her. Melinda's family runs a catering business and they offer Robert a job, warning him that if they miss out on delivering to a client they will lose their truck contract. As Robert is in route to his delivery, he gets a call from Diana saying Prescott wants to reconsider his deal. This causes Robert to abandon his delivery job during mid-route. Prescott offers Robert $800,000 for the design, but Robert wants to license the technology to them instead and declines the offer. Melinda, furious at both Robert's declining of Prescott's offer and his interaction with Diana, files for divorce and moves in with Brenda. Robert moves into a homeless shelter, but Diana finds out and insists that he live with her.

Sunder
Prescott reconsiders and offers Robert a multimillion-dollar deal while allowing him to keep the intellectual property of the battery technology proprietary, which he accepts. Robert visits Melinda at work, although she refuses to reconcile. Robert accepts her decision but, as an apology to her and much to Melinda's surprise, gives her $10 million and buys back her home.

Bewail
After showing her sisters the money Robert has given her and berating them for their influence, Melinda visits Robert in his new penthouse apartment and attempts to seduce him and rekindle their relationship, but Diana comes in and introduces herself as Robert's fiancée.

Deranged
Angry and hurt, Melinda becomes obsessed with the couple and swears to destroy them. Melinda sues Robert and Diana, claiming that the deal with Prescott happened before their divorce, but the case is dismissed. Robert and Diana file a countersuit against Melinda and obtain restraining orders. Melinda retaliates by visiting the bridal shop and destroying Diana's wedding gown with hydrochloric acid, although she is caught and sentenced to court-mandated counseling, where she tells her therapist that Robert took advantage of her. Her therapist suggests that she may have borderline personality disorder. Melinda's mental state further deteriorates after learning Diana is pregnant. On Robert's wedding day, her family and friends are forced to prevent Melinda from leaving her house and ruining the wedding.

Inexorable
Robert and Diana leave on their honeymoon cruise. Melinda sneaks onto the boat, shoots Robert, and makes the crew of the boat jump overboard. Melinda attempts to shoot Diana but Robert tells Diana to take the dinghy and rescue the crew before overpowering Melinda and throwing her in the water. Melinda returns and attempts to kill Robert with an axe but is trapped by the anchor that pulls her off and into the ocean, thus she drowns. Diana returns with the crew and comforts a bleeding Robert.

Cast

Production
Filming took place around Pittsburgh and Atlanta in fall 2016. Tika Sumpter originally was cast as Diana Wells, but later left and Crystle Stewart took the role.

Release
The film was released in the United States on March 30, 2018. It was originally titled She's Living My Life.

Reception

Box office
Acrimony has grossed $43.5million in the United States and Canada, and $2.8million in other territories, for a worldwide total of $46.3million.

In the United States and Canada, Acrimony was released alongside God's Not Dead: A Light in Darkness and Ready Player One, and was projected to gross $10–15 million from 2,006 theaters in its opening weekend. It made $7.6 million on its first day, including $1 million from Thursday night previews. It went on to debut to $17.2 million, finishing second, behind Ready Player One, and besting both projections and the $10 million opening of Henson's Proud Mary two months earlier. It fell 51.2% in its second weekend to $8.4 million, finishing fifth.

Critical response
The website's critical consensus reads, "Tyler Perry's Acrimony might be of interest to hardcore Tyler Perry fans, but all other viewers are advised to make time for another Fatal Attraction screening instead." On Metacritic, the film has a weighted average score of 32 out of 100, based on 14 critics, indicating "generally unfavorable reviews". Audiences polled by CinemaScore gave the film an average grade of "A−" on an A+ to F scale.

Monica Castillo of RogerEbert.com gave the film a negative review, writing that "Taraji P. Henson deserves better." Ben Kenigsberg of The New York Times also gave the film a negative review, writing that "the moral of Acrimony seems to be: Leave a bad man, especially one who cheated on you before marriage and leeches off your financial resources — unless he has poured his life into the dream of inventing a self-recharging battery, in which case the bonds of matrimony are sacrosanct and no sacrifice is too great." He further wrote that the film itself was "endorsing the logic that keeps spouses Stockholm syndrome'd in bad marriages".

See also
List of black films of the 2010s

References

External links
 
 
 

2018 films
2018 horror thriller films
Films directed by Tyler Perry
Films scored by Christopher Lennertz
Films with screenplays by Tyler Perry
Lionsgate films
American erotic romance films
American erotic thriller films
American films about revenge
American horror thriller films
American thriller drama films
American romantic drama films
American romantic thriller films
African-American films
Films about adultery in the United States
Films about sexuality
2010s erotic thriller films
2010s romantic thriller films
2010s English-language films
2010s American films